Hymenoxys cabrerae is a South American species of flowering plant in the daisy family. It has only been found in Argentina

Leaves are divided in thin, narrow segments. Flower heads each contain 115–200 disc flowers but no ray flowers.

References

External links

cabrerae
Flora of Argentina
Plants described in 1962